Hui So Hung (許素虹, Pinjin: Xǔ Sùhóng; born 2 December 1958) is a Hong Kong table tennis player who was born in Indonesia and grew up in Huizhou, Guangdong, China. She played at the 1988 Summer Olympics.

References

Hong Kong female table tennis players
Olympic table tennis players of Hong Kong
Table tennis players at the 1988 Summer Olympics
Living people
1958 births
Table tennis players from Guangdong
Asian Games medalists in table tennis
Table tennis players at the 1978 Asian Games
Table tennis players at the 1986 Asian Games
Medalists at the 1978 Asian Games
Asian Games silver medalists for Hong Kong
20th-century Hong Kong women